This article is about the particular significance of the year 1954 to Wales and its people.

Incumbents
Archbishop of Wales – John Morgan, Bishop of Llandaff
Archdruid of the National Eisteddfod of Wales – Dyfnallt

Events
1 April – Civilian flights from the old Cardiff Municipal Airport at Pengam Moors are transferred to the new Cardiff Airport near Rhoose.
29 May – Gwyneth Phillips marries John Dunwoody, continuing a dynasty of Labour politicians.
19 June – The Welsh Chess Union is founded.
October – Launch of the Empire News, the first Sunday newspaper to be printed and published in Wales. 
19 October – Gwilym Lloyd George becomes Home Secretary and Minister for Welsh Affairs – the first Welshman to hold the position.
9 December – Flag of the Church in Wales officially inaugurated.

Arts and literature

Awards

National Eisteddfod of Wales (held in Ystradgynlais)
National Eisteddfod of Wales: Chair – John Evans, "Yr Argae"
National Eisteddfod of Wales: Crown – E. Llwyd Williams, "Y Bannau"
National Eisteddfod of Wales: Prose Medal – Owen Elias Roberts, Y Gor o Ystradgynlais

New books
Dannie Abse – Ash on a Young Man's Sleeve
Kingsley Amis – Lucky Jim
Glyn Daniel – Welcome Death
Margiad Evans – The Nightingale Silenced (unpublished)
Ronald Fenton – The Story of Sker House
Eiluned Lewis – Honey Pots and Brandy Bottles
V. E. Nash-Williams – The Roman Frontier in Wales
Bertrand Russell – Nightmares of Eminent Persons and Other Stories
Dylan Thomas – Quite Early One Morning

Music
Geraint Evans stars in William Walton's new opera, Troilus and Cressida.
Alun Hoddinott – Clarinet Concerto (performed at the Cheltenham Festival by Gervase de Peyer with the Hallé Orchestra under Sir John Barbirolli).
Arwel Hughes – Menna (opera)
Daniel Jones – Symphony no 4

Film
Donald Houston co-stars in Doctor in the House.
Ray Milland stars in Dial M for Murder.
The Black Knight, starring Alan Ladd, is partly filmed at Castell Coch.

Broadcasting
25 January – Under Milk Wood is performed for the first time on BBC radio with an all-Welsh cast led by Richard Burton and including Hugh Griffith, Rachel Thomas and Philip Burton.

Sport
Football – John Charles finishes the 1953–54 season having scored 42 goals for Leeds United.
Rugby union – Wales win the Five Nations Championship, but a loss against England prevents Wales lifting the Triple Crown.
BBC Wales Sports Personality of the Year – Ken Jones

Births
5 January – Elgan Rees, Wales international rugby player
6 January – John Sparkes, comedian
21 January – Tony Ridler, darts player
12 March – Chris Needs, broadcaster
13 March – Francis Ormsby-Gore, 6th Baron Harlech
17 March – Trish Law, born Patricia Bolter, AM, politician
6 April – Alan Curtis, footballer
19 April – Jon Owen Jones, politician
23 May – David Richards, Wales international rugby player
28 May – Gwyn Morgan, writer
9 June 
Paul Chapman, rock guitarist
Rhys Morgan, Wales international rugby player
7 July – Mickey Thomas, Welsh international footballer
August – Ceri Sherlock, filmmaker and theatre director 
27 August – Bryn Fôn, singer and actor
12 September – Sir Michael Moritz, businessman and philanthropist
19 September – Mark Drakeford, politician
24 September – Helen Lederer, comedian and actress
25 September – Gareth Thomas, politician
12 October – Keith Griffiths, architect
13 October – Kim Davies, cricketer
14 October – Lowri Gwilym, television and radio producer
13 November – Les Keen, Wales international rugby player

Deaths
12 January – Thomas Brinsmead Williams, cricketer, 69
6 March – William Davies Thomas, academic, 74
25 March – William Jackson, footballer, 78 
10 April – Harry Hiams, rugby union international, 67
6 May – J. J. Williams, poet and archdruid, 84
15 June
William Ewart Berry, 1st Viscount Camrose, 74
Charles Edwards, politician, 87
10 July – Jack Anthony, jockey, 64
10 August – Ernest Morgan, architect and painter, 72/73
29 September – William John Gruffydd, author and politician, 73
31 October – Rhys Davies, trade unionist and politician, 77
8 November – Sir Geoffrey Crawshay, soldier and social benefactor, 62
3 December – Sir Joseph Davies, statistician and Liberal politician, 87
14 December – Cliff Pritchard, Welsh international rugby player, 73
20 December – Frank Connah, hockey player, 70
22 December – Robert Richards, Welsh politician, 70

See also
1954 in Northern Ireland

References

 Wales